Tubou is a village on the Fijian island of Lakeba.  One of eight villages on Lakeba, it is considered the capital of the Lau Islands, being the seat of the Vuanirewa clan, a powerful chiefly family from which Fiji's longtime Prime Minister and President, Ratu Sir Kamisese Mara (1920–2004) and one of Fiji's famous cricketers I. L. Bula (1921–2002), hailed.

The Tongan-Fijian warlord Enele Ma'afu, who conquered much of eastern and northern Fiji in the mid-19th century, is buried in Tubou, as are Ratu Sir Lala Sukuna (1888–1958), Fiji's first modern statesman, and Mara himself.  Many early Christian missionaries are also buried in Tubou.

Tubou